The 1980 Tour de France was the 67th edition of Tour de France, one of cycling's Grand Tours. The Tour began in Frankfurt with a prologue individual time trial on 26 June and Stage 11 occurred on 8 July with another individual time trial from Damazan. The race finished on the Champs-Élysées in Paris on 20 July.

Stage 11
8 July 1980 — Damazan to Laplume,  (individual time trial)

Stage 12
9 July 1980 — Agen to Pau,

Stage 13
10 July 1980 — Pau to Bagnères-de-Luchon,

Stage 14
11 July 1980 — Lézignan-Corbières to Montpellier,

Stage 15
12 July 1980 — Montpellier to Martigues,

Stage 16
13 July 1980 — Trets to Pra-Loup,

Stage 17
14 July 1980 — Serre Chevalier to Morzine,

Stage 18
16 July 1980 — Morzine to Prapoutel Les sept Laux,

Stage 19
17 July 1980 — Voreppe to Saint-Étienne,

Stage 20
18 July 1980 — Saint-Étienne to Saint-Étienne,  (individual time trial)

Stage 21
19 July 1980 — Auxerre to Fontenay-sous-Bois,

Stage 22
20 July 1980 — Fontenay-sous-Bois to Paris Champs-Élysées,

References

1980 Tour de France
Tour de France stages